Many of the authors that served in various real-life wars (and survived) wrote stories that are at least somewhat based on their own experiences. Some of them are outright memoirs or fictionalized accounts of their exploits.

Greco-Persian Wars
 Xenophon, (Anabasis)

Gallic War
 Julius Caesar, (De Bello Gallico)

Napoleonic Wars
 Jakob Walter

American Civil War
 Ambrose Bierce
 August Hjalmar Edgren
 Walt Whitman Nurse

Mexican Revolution
 Mariano Azuela, (Los de abajo)

World War I
 Henri Barbusse, served in France (Under Fire)
 E. E. Cummings, volunteer ambulance driver (The Enormous Room)
 Robert Graves, infantry officer in the Royal Welch Fusiliers (Goodbye to All That)
 Jaroslav Hašek, served in Austrian and Czech armies (who were on opposing sides), (The Good Soldier Švejk)
Ernest Hemingway, drove ambulances in Italy (A Farewell to Arms)
William Hope Hodgson, Killed by the direct impact of an artillery shell at the Fourth Battle of Ypres (The House on the Borderland) 
 Ernst Jünger, (Sturm, Storm of Steel)
 T. E. Lawrence, Lawrence of Arabia (Seven Pillars of Wisdom)
 C. S. Lewis, British Army, Third Battalion Somerset Light Infantry, served in trench warfare at Somme Valley (The Chronicles of Narnia)
 A. A. Milne, British Army, British Home Guard
 Emilio Lussu, (Sardinian Brigade)
 H. E. L. Mellersh, infantry officer in the East Lancashire Regiment (Schoolboy Into War)
 Wilfred Owen
 Erich Maria Remarque, infantry soldier, wounded in Passchendaele (All Quiet on the Western Front)
 Ludwig Renn,  company commander, and a field battalion commander, Saxon Guard Regiment ("Krieg", "Nachkrieg", "War")
 Siegfried Sassoon, infantry officer in the Royal Welch Fusiliers (Memoirs of an Infantry Officer)
 J. R. R. Tolkien, Lancashire Fusiliers, served in trench warfare at Somme Valley, Battle at Thiepval Ridge and assault on Schwaben Redoubt (The Lord of the Rings), 2nd Lt. 
 Lajos Zilahy, (Century in Scarlet)
 Joyce Kilmer, killed during the Second Battle of Marne

Spanish Civil War
 Alvah Bessie, volunteer, served in the Abraham Lincoln XV International Brigade on the Republican side (Men In Battle; A Story Of Americans In Spain) 
 Arthur Koestler, interned by the Nationalists
 Laurie Lee, served on the Republican side (A Moment of War)
 George Orwell, served and wounded on the Republican side (Homage to Catalonia)
 Albert Prago, volunteer, served in the Abraham Lincoln XV International Brigade on the Republican side (Our fight : writings by veterans of the Abraham Lincoln Brigade, Spain, 1936–1939)
 Gustaf Munch-Petersen, served and died in the International Brigades

World War II
 Brian Aldiss, Royal Corps of Signals, saw action in Burma (Non-Stop, [No Time Like Tomorrow])
 Kingsley Amis, Royal Corps of Signals (Lucky Jim)
 Philip Appleman
 Ashley Bryan, Operation Overlord,Omaha Beach (Artist and Author, Wrote Infinite Hope: A Black Artist's Journey from World War II to Peace about his experiences )
 Isaac Asimov, Philadelphia Navy Yard Naval Air Experimentation Station, United States Army (Foundation)
 J. G. Ballard, interned as a boy in Shanghai (Empire of the Sun)
 Capt. Edward L. Beach, Jr., United States Navy (Run Silent, Run Deep)
 Earle Birney, Canadian Army (Turvey)
 Pierre Boulle, British Special Forces (Bridge on the River Kwai)
 Flt. Lt. Arthur C. Clarke, Royal Air Force (2001: A Space Odyssey)
 Col. Hal Clement, pilot Consolidated B-24 Liberator, 68th Bomb Squadron, 44th Bomb Group, 8th Air Force, European Theatre (Mission of Gravity)
 L. Sprague de Camp, Philadelphia Navy Yard Naval Air Experimentation Station (Lest Darkness Fall) pilot
 Roald Dahl, Royal Air Force, saw combat in the Mediterranean and was a flying ace. Wrote Charlie and the Chocolate Factory.
 Anthony Faramus, survived Fort de Romainville, Buchenwald and Mauthausen concentration camps  (Journey Into Darkness. 1990)
 Frank Kelly Freas, United States Army Air Forces, South Pacific
 Samuel Fuller, – (The Big Red One)
 H. L. Gold, United States Army (Beyond Fantasy Fiction)
 William Golding, participated in the invasion of Normandy on D-Day, commanding a landing ship that fired salvoes of rockets onto the beaches, and was in action at Walcheren at which 23 out of 24 assault craft were sunk. (Lord of the Flies)
.Günter Grass Nobel Prize 1999, Waffen-SS, Germany. Tin Drum
 James Gunn (author), U.S. Navy (This Fortress World)
 Dashiell Hammett, was assigned to Army Intelligence on the Aleutian Islands. He assisted in writing Battle of the Aleutians... He went on to write a number of detective novels
 Sven Hassel, Danish-born penal regiment soldier
 Robert A. Heinlein, Lt., graduate of the United States Naval Academy.
 Joseph Heller, served in 12th Air Force (Catch-22)
 Herman Wouk, served in the Navy, Pacific (The Caine Mutiny)
 Frank Herbert, U.S. Navy Seabees (Dune)
 James Herriot, served in the Royal Air Force
 L. Ron Hubbard, U.S. Navy (The Way to Happiness)
 James Jones (author), 25th Infantry Division, United States Army, Pearl Harbor, Guadalcanal (From Here to Eternity, The Thin Red Line)
 Lt.Col Jorma Karhunen, Finnish fighter ace and Mannerheim Cross awardee, a notable fiction and history author
 Cyril M. Kornbluth, United States Army. Bronze Star recipient for service as heavy machine gunner at the Battle of the Bulge (The Space Merchants)
 R. A. Lafferty, 1st Sgt., United States Army Pacific Theatre (Fourth Mansions)
 Alistair MacLean, Royal Navy (HMS Ulysses)
 Sgt. Väinö Linna, served in the Finnish army
 Norman Mailer, served in South Pacific (The Naked and the Dead)
 Harry Martinson, Swedish volunteer in Winter War (Verklighet Till Döds)
 John Masters Gurkha officer, served in North Africa and Burma with the Chindits (Bhowani Junction, The Road Past Mandalay)
 Samuel Menashe, United States Army, served in the Battle of the Bulge.
 Nicholas Monsarrat, served in the Royal Navy
 Sgt. Frederik Pohl, United States Army Air Forces, 456th Bombardment Group, European Theatre (Gateway)
 Douglas Reeman, served in the Royal Navy
 Cornelius Ryan, war correspondent in the US Army
 J.D. Salinger, United States Army, 12th Infantry Regiment, 4th Infantry Division, active at Utah Beach on D-Day, in the Battle of the Bulge, and the Battle of Hürtgen Forest. (The Catcher in the Rye)
 Harvey Shapiro, United States Army Air Force, flew 35 combat missions over Europe as a Boeing B-17 Flying Fortress tail gunner and was awarded the Distinguished Flying Cross
 Col. Konstantin Simonov, Soviet Army (The Immortal Garrison)
 C.J.R. Tolkien, served in the Fleet Air Arm
 Leon Uris, United States Marine Corps, Pacific Theatre, Guadalcanal, Tarawa (Battle Cry)
 A. E. van Vogt, Canadian Department of National Defence (Slan)
 Pvt. Gore Vidal, United States Army (Julian)
 Pvt. Kurt Vonnegut, United States Army infantry soldier, 423rd Infantry Regiment, 106th Infantry Division, captured during the Battle of the Bulge, survived bombing of Dresden as a POW (Slaughterhouse Five)
 Lt. Evelyn Waugh, Royal Marines, later Royal Horse Guards served in Crete and Yugoslavia (Men at Arms, The End of the Battle)
 Jack Williamson, U.S. Army Air Corps (Darker Than You Think)
 William Woodruff was a Major in the 24th Guards Brigade of the British 1st Infantry Division at Anzio. Vessel of Sadness is based on his experience of the battle.
 Cpl. John Wyndham, Royal Corps of Signals, landed at Normandy (The Day of the Triffids)
 Richard Yates (novelist)

Korean War
 "Richard Hooker"

First Indochina War
 Pierre Schoendoerffer

Vietnam War
 David Drake
 David Hackworth, in US Army (Vietnam Primer, About Face, Steel My Soldiers' Hearts)
 Joe Haldeman
 Gustav Hasford
 Ron Kovic
 Karl Marlantes, US Marine Corps (What it is Like to Go to War, Matterhorn)
 Tim O'Brien
 James Robinson Risner
 Senator Jim Webb
 Tobias Wolff
 Stephen Wright 
 Robert Jordan US Army helicopter gunner

Falklands War
 Robert Lawrence, (When The Fighting Is Over)

Gulf War
 "Andy McNab"
 "Chris Ryan"
 Anthony Swofford, in US Marines (Jarhead (book))

Iraq War
 Colby Buzzell

Afghanistan War
 Weston Ochse

See also
 List of military writers – people who write about war but did not necessarily serve in war

References

War